Prem Sanyas (The Light of Asia) (Die Leuchte Asiens in German) is a 1925 silent film, directed by Franz Osten and Himansu Rai. It was adapted from the book, The Light of Asia (1879) in verse, by Edwin Arnold, based on the life of Prince Siddhartha Gautama, who founded Buddhism by becoming the Buddha or the "Enlightened one".

Production
The film was an Indo-European co-production, with German technicians and Indian actors, and it managed to steer clear of the usual exotic depiction of Indian culture favoured by western filmmakers up until then. It was made with the cooperation of the Maharajah of Jaipur and contained a cast of thousands. Shooting took place in Lahore, in what is now Pakistan, where the set decoration was created by Devika Rani, the wife of actor/director Himanshu Rai and a noted actress herself. The film was released in the USA by the Film Arts Guild on 11 May 1928.

Synopsis

A tale from India about the origin of the Buddha, Prem Sanyas depicts the story of Prince Siddhartha Gautama (portrayed by director Himansu Rai), the man who became the Buddha, as he journeys from privilege and seclusion to awareness of the inevitability of life's suffering, finally renouncing his kingdom to seek enlightenment.

Restoration and release
The film was restored by Arte, and released in 2001.

Cast
 Seeta Devi Gopa
 Himansu Rai: Gautama
 Sarada Ukil: King Suddhodhana
 Rani Bala: Queen Maya
 Profulla Roy

See also 
Depictions of Gautama Buddha in film
List of films made in Weimar Germany

References

External links

 
 Spicevienna.org, Prem Sanyas
 Short extract on Youtube

1925 films
German black-and-white films
Films of the Weimar Republic
Films about Gautama Buddha
German silent feature films
Indian silent films
Films directed by Franz Osten
Films based on poems
Articles containing video clips